Les Adrets is a commune in the Isère department in southeastern France. It is situated 30 km northeast of Grenoble. It is one of the commune of the Les sept Laux winter sports resort.

Population

See also
Communes of the Isère department

References

Communes of Isère